Farmers National Bank may refer to:

in the United States (by state)
Farmers National Bank (Stafford, Kansas), listed on the National Register of Historic Places in Stafford County, Kansas
 Farmers National Bank of Kittanning (Kittanning, Pennsylvania)
 Farmers National Bank (Plain City, Ohio), listed on the National Register of Historic Places in Madison County, Ohio
Farmers National Bank (Hillsboro, Texas), listed on the National Register of Historic Places in Hill County, Texas

See also
Farmers Bank Building (disambiguation)